"Invisible" is Christina Grimmie’s first posthumous single which was released on Friday, February 17, 2017, by UMG and Republic Records. The song was scheduled to be released on Tuesday, February 14, 2017 but due to Christina getting the major record deal for her posthumous music with her family they decided to release it on Friday, February 17, 2017, for #NewMusicFriday and because every artist with a record deal has to release their new music on a Friday. It was premiered exclusively on Elvis Duran Show on February 16, 2017 alongside the lyric video that was uploaded on Grimmie's official YouTube channel the same day. Later, the single was supplemented with an animated superhero music video on March 10, 2017.

Music video
On Friday, March 10, 2017, Christina’s family and her team released the official music video for Invisible which features an anime character version of Christina and her buddy, just two days before what would have been The Voice singer's 23rd birthday. In a message posted along with the anime-style clip, her family wrote, "Introducing the world premiere of the official video for Invisible. As many of you know, Christina loved video games and had a special fondness for anime. We created this video as a special tribute to honor that love and her desire to always bring light and love into the heart of others." 
In the clip directed by Stephen Leonard of Giant Pancake, Grimmie receives a magic hoverboard from a pink creature and sails through a city vaporizing evil creatures with beams of light that blast from her hands. As of February 2018, the video has over 750K views on YouTube while the lyrics video has over 1 million views.

Personnel
Credits are adapted from the reference sources.
Personnel
 Christina Grimmie – lead vocals, songwriting
 Mark Grimmie – guitar
 Neal Avron – mixing
 Stephen Rezza – producer, songwriting

Track listing

Release history

References

2017 songs
Songs released posthumously
Animated music videos